WTOP may refer to:

Radio stations
WTOP-FM 103.5, a radio station in Washington, D.C.
WBQH 1050, a radio station licensed to Silver Spring, Maryland, United States that held the call sign WTOP during 2010
WFED 1500, an AM radio station in Washington, D.C. that held the WTOP call letters from 1943 until 2005
 A three-station network simulcasting WTOP (the current WFED) from 1997 until 2005, see WTOP-FM
WHUR-FM 96.3, a radio station in Washington, D.C. that held the WTOP-FM call letters from 1949 until 1971

Television stations
WUSA (TV), the CBS television affiliate for Washington, D.C. that held the WTOP-TV call letters from 1950 until 1978

Organisations
Wiltshire Traditional Orchards Project, an organisation that maps, conserves and restores traditional orchards within Wiltshire, United Kingdom